Function test (or functional test) can refer to:

 Thyroid function tests
 Liver function tests
 Lung function test
 Functional testing